Poroy District is one of eight districts of the province Cusco in Peru.

References